Geryt Potter van der Loo (died 10 November 1454) was a Dutch nobleman at the court of Jacqueline, Countess of Hainaut until her death in 1436, and from 24 April 1445 a councillor of the Court of Holland in The Hague. His Middle Dutch translation of Froissart's Chronicles is one of the 1000 notable works in the Canon of Dutch Literature.

References

1454 deaths
Medieval Dutch nobility
French–Dutch translators
15th-century people of the Holy Roman Empire